Hamad Hospital station is a station on the Doha Metro's Green Line in Qatar. It is found on Al Rayyan Road in the Al Sadd district of Doha, opposite of Hamad Hospital in Hamad Medical City. It serves both aforementioned districts.

The station currently has one metrolink. Facilities on the premises include restrooms and a prayer room.

History
The station was opened to the public on 10 December 2019 along with the other stations of the Green Line (also known as the Education Line).

Station Layout

Metrolinks
Hamad Hospital station has one metrolink, which is the Doha Metro's free feeder bus network, servicing the station:

M210, which serves Al Sadd (Zone 38).

Connections
It is served by bus routes 40, 41, 42, 43, 45, 49, 94, 104, 104A, and 104B.

References

Doha Metro stations
2019 establishments in Qatar
Railway stations opened in 2019